Kenny Haynes is an American former basketball player. He played college basketball for the Lamar Cardinals as a three-year starter from 1967 to 1970 and is considered one of the team's great defensive players. Haynes led the Cardinals to the Southland Conference championship and was selected as the Southland Player of the Year in 1970. He was named to the All-Southland Second Team in 1970.

Haynes attended Dixon High School in Dixon, Illinois, and graduated in 1966.

Haynes was inducted into the Cardinal Hall of Honor in 2000.

References

External links
College statistics

Year of birth missing (living people)
Living people
American men's basketball players
Basketball players from Illinois
Guards (basketball)
Lamar Cardinals basketball players
People from Dixon, Illinois